Montgomeryite is a phosphate mineral with the chemical formula Ca4MgAl4(PO4)6(OH)4·12H2O. The mineral was discovered in Fairfield, Utah in a variscite nodule. Montgomeryite is a very rare mineral and can only be found in a few places in the world.

References

Phosphate minerals